Ervin Moldován (born February 5, 1978) is a Romanian ice hockey player who is currently playing for HSC Csíkszereda in the MOL Liga and the Romanian Hockey League.

Moldován has played for the Romania men's national ice hockey team at the 15 Ice Hockey World Championships. He also represented his country twice at the IIHF European U18 Championships.

References

1978 births
Romanian ice hockey players
Romanian ice hockey left wingers
HSC Csíkszereda players
Romanian sportspeople of Hungarian descent
Living people
Sportspeople from Miercurea Ciuc